Cramér's theorem may refer to 
 Cramér’s decomposition theorem, a statement about the sum of normal distributed random variable
 Cramér's theorem (large deviations), a fundamental result in the theory of large deviations
 Cramer's theorem (algebraic curves), a result regarding the necessary number of points to determine a curve

See also 
 Cramer's rule